Licania morii is a species of plant in the family Chrysobalanaceae. It is endemic to Panama.

References

Endemic flora of Panama
morii
Data deficient plants
Taxonomy articles created by Polbot
Taxobox binomials not recognized by IUCN